Fânaţe may refer to several villages in Romania:

 Fânaţe, a village in Câmpani Commune, Bihor County
 Fânaţe, a village in Urmeniș Commune, Bistriţa-Năsăud County
 Fânaţe, a village in Ceanu Mare Commune, Cluj County
 Fânaţe, a village in Cernești Commune, Maramureș County
 Fânaţe, a village in Band, Mureş
 Fânaţe, a village in Fărăgău Commune, Mureș County
 Fânaţe, a village in Iclănzel Commune, Mureș County
 Fânaţe, a village in Tăureni Commune, Mureș County

See also
Fânari (disambiguation)